Night Dreamer is the fourth album by American jazz saxophonist Wayne Shorter. It was released in November 1964 by Blue Note Records. With a quintet of trumpeter Lee Morgan, pianist McCoy Tyner, bassist Reggie Workman and drummer Elvin Jones performing six Shorter originals.

In 2005, it was reissued as part of the RVG Edition series with liner notes by Nat Hentoff.

Concept and compositions
At this point of his career, Shorter felt his writing was changing. While the previous compositions had a "lot of detail", this new approach had a simplistic quality to it. "I used to use a lot of chord changes, for instance, but now I can separate the wheat from the chaff."

In an interview with Nat Hentoff, Shorter focused on the album's meaning: "What I'm trying to express here is a sense of judgment approaching - judgment for everything alive from the smallest ant to man. I know that the accepted meaning of "Armageddon" is the last battle between good and evil - whatever it is. But my definition of the judgment to come is a period of total enlightenment in which we will discover what we are and why we're here."

"Night Dreamer" has mostly a minor feel, often perceived by Shorter as "evening or night", hence the "Night" in the title. It is a  "floating" piece, yet, "although the beat does float, it also is set in a heavy groove. It's a paradox, in a way, like you'd have in a dream". This explains the "Dreamer" part. Shorter first heard "Oriental Folk Song" as the theme for a commercial, then he discovered it was an old Chinese song. He meant "Virgo" (Shorter's star sign) to be "optimistic", whilst in "Black Nile" he tried to get a flowing feeling, like a "depiction of a river route." "Charcoal Blues" should represent a sort of backtracking piece, linking the past and the present time together: "The old blues and funk were good for their times and place, but what I'm trying to do now is to get the meat out of the old blues while also presaging the different kind of blues to come. [...] I'm both looking back at the good things in those older blues and also laughing at that part of my background". Shorter underlines that the laughter is not mocking but satirical, "from the inside". Ultimately, "Armageddon" was considered by Shorter as the focal point of the album.

Track listing
All compositions by Wayne Shorter
 "Night Dreamer" – 7:18
 "Oriental Folk Song" – 6:54
 "Virgo" – 7:09
 "Black Nile" – 6:29
 "Charcoal Blues" – 6:54
 "Armageddon" – 6:22
 "Virgo" [Alternate Take] – 7:03 Bonus track on CD reissue

Personnel

Musicians 
 Wayne Shorter – tenor saxophone
 Lee Morgan – trumpet
 McCoy Tyner – piano
 Reggie Workman – bass
 Elvin Jones – drums

Additional personnel 
 Alfred Lion – original recording producer
 Rudy Van Gelder – recording engineer
 Michael Cuscuna – reissue producer
 Francis Wolff – cover photograph

References

External links 
 Wayne Shorter - Night Dreamer (1964) album releases & credits at Discogs
 Wayne Shorter - Night Dreamer (1964) album to be listened on Spotify
 Wayne Shorter - Night Dreamer (1964) album to be listened on YouTube

Blue Note Records albums
1964 albums
Wayne Shorter albums
Albums produced by Alfred Lion
Albums recorded at Van Gelder Studio
Modal jazz albums
Post-bop albums